Baron Charles Athanase Walckenaer (25 December 1771 – 28 April 1852) was a French civil servant and scientist.

Biography
Walckenaer was born in Paris and studied at the universities of Oxford and Glasgow. In 1793 he was appointed head of the military transports in the Pyrenees, after which he pursued technical studies at the École Nationale des Ponts et Chaussées and the École polytechnique. He was elected member of the Institut de France in 1813, was mayor (maire) in the 5th arrondissement in Paris and secretary-general of the prefect of the Seine 1816–1825. He was made a baron in 1823.

In 1839 he was appointed conservator for the Department of Maps at the Royal Library in Paris and in 1840 secretary for life in the Académie des Inscriptions et Belles Lettres. He was one of the founders of the Société entomologique de France in 1832, and a "resident member" of the Société des observateurs de l'homme.

Walckenaer introduced the full biography according to the English model into French literature through his works Histoire de la vie et des ouvrages de la Fontaine (1820, 4th ed. 1858), Histoire de la vie et des poésies d'Horace (1840; new ed. 1858) and Mémoires touchent la vie et les écrits de Mme de Sevigné (6 volumes, 1842–1865). In the works of La Bruyère, which he published in 1845, he returned to the original text.

In the area of geography, he discovered the map of Juan de la Cosa, the oldest extant map that shows the American continent, and published La monde maritime (4 vols., 1818), Histoire générale des voyages (21 vols., 1826–1831) and Géographie ancienne, historique et comparée des Gaules (3 vols., 1839, new ed. 1862). He was also an entomologist and arachnologist who published, among other things, the Histoire naturelle des insectes (4 vols., 1836–1847) together with Paul Gervais.
He was also the scientist who transferred the black widow to its current genus and discovered multiple species of Cyclosa, including C. turbinata.

External links
Google Books Digital Version of Apteres Histoire naturelle des insectes

Spider Drawings by John Abbot  

1771 births
1852 deaths
French entomologists
French arachnologists
18th-century French civil servants
Barons Walckenaer
École Polytechnique alumni
Members of the Académie des Inscriptions et Belles-Lettres
Burials at Père Lachaise Cemetery
19th-century French civil servants
Presidents of the Société entomologique de France
18th-century French zoologists
19th-century French zoologists
Scientists from Paris
Alumni of the University of Oxford
Alumni of the University of Glasgow